Mikaël Charland is a professional Canadian football defensive back for the Edmonton Eskimos of the Canadian Football League (CFL). He was drafted by the Redblacks 16th overall in the second round of the 2016 CFL Draft. While he didn't dress in the game, he won his first Grey Cup championship in his rookie year when the Redblacks defeated the Stampeders in the 104th Grey Cup. Following his 2017 training camp release, he signed with the Montreal Alouettes in June 2017 and played for one year with them until he was released and re-signed by the Redblacks. He played Canadian Interuniversity Sport football for the Concordia Stingers.

References

External links 
Ottawa Redblacks bio

1991 births
Living people
Canadian football defensive backs
Concordia Stingers football players
Ottawa Redblacks players
Players of Canadian football from Quebec
Sportspeople from Gatineau
Montreal Alouettes players